Lü Xianjing (born 2 February 1998) is a Chinese cyclist, who currently rides for UCI Continental team .

Major results

2018
 3rd Overall Tour of Fuzhou
1st Stage 1
 5th Overall Tour of Hainan
1st  Mountains classification
2019
 1st  Overall Tour of China II
Tour of Quanzhou Bay
1st  Mountains classification
1st Stage 3
 2nd Road race, Asian Road Championships
 4th Overall Tour of Fuzhou

References

External links

1998 births
Living people
Chinese male cyclists
Cyclists from Yunnan
Cyclists at the 2018 Asian Games
Medalists at the 2018 Asian Games
Asian Games silver medalists for China
Asian Games medalists in cycling
20th-century Chinese people
21st-century Chinese people